Puerto Tirol is a town in Chaco Province, Argentina. It is the head town of the Libertad Department.

The town was founded on August 6, 1888. The name refers to the origin of the initial settlers, who came from the Southern part of the Austro-Hungarian County of Tyrol (in German "Tirol"), an alpine region in Central Europe, today comprising Tyrol, Austria and South Tyrol, Italy.

There is another Tyrolian town in South America, about 900 km to the East, Treze Tilias, in Santa Catarina, Brazil (founded in 1933).

External links

 Puerto Tirol website

Populated places in Chaco Province
Populated places established in 1888
1888 establishments in Argentina